Derek Hood may refer to:

Derek Hood (basketball) (born 1976), American basketball player
Derek Hood (footballer) (born 1958), English former footballer